Sir Thomas Cato Worsfold, 1st Baronet DL JP (14 February 1861 – 11 July 1936) was a British baronet and politician. He gained an LLD from Trinity College Dublin and in 1918 he was elected as a Coalition Conservative Member of Parliament (MP) for Mitcham. He resigned from the House of Commons on 13 February 1923 by appointment as Steward of the Chiltern Hundreds. The following year he was created a baronet, of The Hall Place in the Parish of Mitcham in the County of Surrey.

References

1861 births
1936 deaths
Baronets in the Baronetage of the United Kingdom
Conservative Party (UK) MPs for English constituencies
Deputy Lieutenants of Surrey
Knights of Grace of the Order of St John
UK MPs 1918–1922
UK MPs 1922–1923
Alumni of Trinity College Dublin